Rauter is a surname. Notable people with the surname include:

Ben Rauter (born 1979), professional rugby league footballer
Bernadette Rauter (born 1949), Austrian former alpine skier 
Ernst Alexander Rauter (1929–2006), Austrian author and journalist
Hanns Albin Rauter (1895–1949), Executed Austrian Nazi SS war criminal
Herbert Rauter (born 1982), Austrian footballer
Vic Rauter (born 1955), Canadian sportscaster

References